Lahsa may refer to:

Lahsa Apso, a dog breed originating in Tibet
Lahsa Eyalet, an eyalet of the Ottoman Empire, now part of Kuwait and Qatar
Los Angeles High School of the Arts (LAHSA), in Central Los Angeles, California, U.S.

See also
Al-Hasa (disambiguation)
Lhasa (disambiguation)
Lassa (disambiguation)